Calum Maclean may refer to:
 Calum Maclean (folklorist)
 Calum Maclean (broadcaster)